Ian Emlyn Bishop (born 26 August 1977) is an English cricketer who played first-class cricket for Somerset and Surrey and List A cricket for Devon, Surrey, and the Surrey Cricket Board between 1996 and 2004. He was born in Taunton, Somerset.

A tail-end batsman and a right-arm fast bowler, Bishop played for Somerset's second eleven from 1995 but made only one first-team appearance, the match against the 1996 Pakistan touring team and he failed to take a wicket in that. Bishop left Somerset after a year in the second team in 1997; in 1998 he played Minor Counties cricket for Devon and made his List A debut in the NatWest Trophy match against Yorkshire, without success. In the second half of the 1998 season, he began playing second-team matches for Surrey and in 1999, after appearing in the Surrey Cricket Board side in the first round of the NatWest Trophy one-day competition, he appeared in several Surrey first-team games in the Sunday League, taking four wickets for 34 runs, his best List A figures, in the game against Durham. He was less successful in a handful of first-class matches for the Surrey first team, with best bowling figures of two wickets for 45 runs in the game against Derbyshire. There were a few further List A and first-class matches for Bishop in 2000 but he did not improve on these figures and after a few second-eleven matches in 2001 he left the Surrey staff. He resumed playing Minor Counties cricket with Devon and that brought further List A appearances between 2002 and 2004.

References

1977 births
Living people
English cricketers
Somerset cricketers
Surrey cricketers
Surrey Cricket Board cricketers
Devon cricketers
Sportspeople from Taunton